ITM Power plc is an energy storage and clean fuel company founded in the UK in 2001. It designs, manufactures, and integrates electrolysers based on proton exchange membrane (PEM) technology to produce green hydrogen using renewable electricity and tap water. Hydrogen produced via electrolysis is used for mobility, Power-to-X, and industry.

The company floated on the Alternative Investment Market (AIM) in 2004, becoming the first hydrogen company publicly listed on the London Stock Exchange (LSE). LSE has also granted the company a Green Economy Mark.

ITM Power is headquartered in Sheffield within the world's largest electrolyser factory. It also operates from a further two Sheffield-based sites and an office located in Hesse, Germany.

History

Early years 
ITM Power was founded in June 2001 in Saffron Walden, Cambridgeshire and originally manufactured fuel cells before expanding into electrolysers. In 2004, the company floated on the AIM Market raising £10 million.

2010-2011 
Its first sale was an electrolyser for the University of Birmingham, UK. In 2011, ITM Power GmbH, the company's German subsidiary, was incorporated.

2019 
The company raised £52 million via a second equity fundraise in 2019. This included a strategic investment of £38 million from Linde plc and the establishment of the joint venture, ITM Linde Electrolysis (ILE), to provide green gas solutions at industrial scale. ILE was incorporated in January 2020.

ITM signed a collaboration agreement with Iwatani Corporation of America, a wholly-owned subsidiary of Japan's Iwatani Corporation, for the deployment of multi megawatt electrolyser-based hydrogen energy systems in North America.

2020 
ITM enacted a third fundraise, raising £172 million in equity that included a £30 million investment from Snam S.p.A.

2021 
In January the company sold a 24MW PEM electrolyser unit, the largest in the world, to Linde. The unit will be installed at the Leuna Chemical Complex in Germany. Production is due to start in the second half of 2022.  

In March the company marked its first deployment in Japan with the sale of a 1.4MW electrolyser to Sumitomo Corporation.

August marked the official opening of Bessemer Park in Sheffield. The facility has an electrolyser manufacturing capacity of 1GW per annum, making it the largest in the world to date.

In October the company raised £250 million to expand manufacturing capacity to 5GW per annum by 2024.

2022 
Full-year results revealed that annual pre-tax losses almost doubled to £46.7m on the back of £5.6m of revenues. The firm admitted that it has scrapped its 5GW annual capacity target by 2025, now aiming for 1.5GW per annum by 2023. It also scrapped its previous decision to open a second UK factory in Sheffield. It also announced that CEO for 13 years, Graham Cooley, would leave once a successor was appointed.

Industrial projects
ITM Power is currently engaged with industry and academia partners in several projects to deploy its technology and products in existing and emerging markets.

REFHYNE 
The REFHYNE project aims to supply clean refinery hydrogen for Europe. Comprising a partnership including ITM Power and Shell, it is funded by the European Commission's Fuel Cells and Hydrogen Joint Undertaking (FCH JU).

Following two years of construction, Shell launched Europe's largest hydrogen electrolysis plant at its Rhineland Refinery in Wesseling, Germany. The PEM electrolyser supplied by ITM Power is the largest of its kind to be deployed on a major industrial scale. The project will investigate the feasibility of introducing similar technology in other industry plants.

In October 2020, the REFHYNE II consortium, which aims to install a 100-MW electrolyser at Shell's Energy and Chemicals Park, Rheinland, secured a EUR-32.4-million grant from the European Climate, Infrastructure and Environment Executive Agency.

HyDeploy 
HyDeploy is an energy trial to establish the potential for blending up to 20% zero carbon hydrogen into the normal gas supply to reduce carbon dioxide emissions. It was the first trial of its kind in the UK.

The £7 million project was funded by Ofgem and led by gas network Cadent in partnership with Northern Gas Networks, with ITM Power supplying the electrolyser system. 100 homes and 30 university faculty buildings on a private gas network at Keele University in Staffordshire received the blended gas during the first phase which ended in March 2021.

The trial was designed to determine the level of hydrogen which could be used by gas consumers safely and with no changes to their behaviour or existing domestic appliances. A second phase launched in August 2021 and is due for completion in 2022.

Hydrogen refuelling stations
ITM Power installed an electrolyser driven hydrogen refuelling station (HRS) named Hfuel at the University of Nottingham in 2012. The refuelling station can provide hydrogen at 350 bar to vehicles and 150 bar to the university's laboratory.

In September 2015, it opened the HRS at the Advanced Manufacturing Park in Rotherham, Yorkshire.

Another station, located at the National Physical Laboratory in Teddington, London, opened in May 2016. It was the first of three such stations launched under the pan-European HyFive Project, funded by the FCH JU and the UK Government Office of Low Emission Vehicles (OLEV).

The second HyFive station was opened at East London's Centre of Engineering Manufacturing Excellence (CEME) in October 2016. This station uses a solar photovoltaic array to produce renewable hydrogen on-site for public and private fleets operating fuel cell electric vehicles to recharge.

The third and final HRS under the HyFive project was opened in February 2017. Located at the Cobham Motorway Service Area on the M25 motorway, it was the first HRS in the UK to be located on a forecourt and Shell's first in the UK.

In 2020, the company set up the ITM Motive division to manage its HRS assets. In 2021, the division was established as a separate, wholly-owned subsidiary, owning and operating a portfolio of 12 publicly accessible HRS assets. It is currently the largest HRS operator in the UK.

UKH2Mobility
UKH2Mobility is a government and cross-industry programme to make hydrogen powered travel in the UK a reality. Industry signatories to the Memorandum of Understanding are:
 Air Liquide Hydrogen Energy, SA
 Air Products and Chemicals PLC
 Daimler AG
 Hyundai Motor Company
 Intelligent Energy Limited
 ITM Power
 Johnson Matthey PLC
 Nissan Motor Manufacturing (UK) Limited
 Scottish and Southern Energy plc
 Tata Motors European Technical Centre plc
 The BOC Group Limited
 Toyota Motor Corporation
 Vauxhall Motors

Ecoisland Partnership CIC
In July 2012, ITM Power, along with four other companies, was selected by the Technology Strategy Board (now Innovate UK) innovation agency and the Department of Energy and Climate Change in the United Kingdom to develop ways of using clean energy on transport systems. ITM's assigned project was to build an electrolysis based hydrogen refueller to be used as transport fuel on the Isle of Wight. The plan is to make the Isle of Wight carbon neutral, by having residents create fuel at their home.

References

External links
 

Electric power companies of England
Fuel cell manufacturers
Manufacturing companies based in Sheffield
Energy companies established in 2001
Renewable resource companies established in 2001
British companies established in 2001